William Augustus Reeder (August 28, 1849 – November 7, 1929) was a U.S. Representative from Kansas.

Born near Shippensburg, Pennsylvania, Reeder moved with his parents to Ipava, Illinois, in 1853, attended the public schools, and taught school in Illinois 1863-1871.  Reeder moved to Beloit, Kansas, in 1871, and served as principal of the Beloit public schools from 1871-1879.  Reeder then moved to Logan, Kansas, in 1880, and engaged in banking there.  Reeder was interested in irrigation farming 1891-1901.

Reeder was elected as a Republican to the Fifty-sixth and to the five succeeding congresses (March 4, 1899 – March 3, 1911). serving as chairman of the committee on mileage during the (Fifty-seventh, Fifty-eighth, and Fifty-ninth congresses), and on the committee on the irrigation of arid lands during (Sixtieth and Sixty-first congresses.  Reeder was an unsuccessful candidate for renomination in 1910.

Reeder moved to Los Angeles, California, in 1911 and to Beverly Hills, California, in 1913, where he engaged in banking and in the real estate business until 1926.  He died in Beverly Hills, California, on November 7, 1929, and was interred in Hollywood Cemetery, Hollywood, California.

References

External links 
 

1849 births
1929 deaths
People from Cumberland County, Pennsylvania
California Republicans
Republican Party members of the United States House of Representatives from Kansas